Abd al-Ghafir ibn Ismail ibn Abd al-Ghafir ibn Muhammad al-Farsi was a Persian scholar of Arabic, history and hadith  from Nishapur. He was a student, contemporary, and first biographer of Al-Ghazali. He was also the grandson of Al-Qushayri, the author of Qushayri message.

Works
Amongst the most famous works of Abd al-Ghafir al-Farsi are:

 Al-Bayan al-Tareekh Nishapur (The History of Nishapur)
 Al-Mufhim of Sahih-Muslim 
 Majma al-Gharaaib Fi Gharib al-Hadith (The book was printed and verified by Abdullah bin Nasser bin Muhammad Al-Qarni (Umm Al-Qura University - 1409 AH / 1989 AD))

Death
Abd al-Ghafir al-Farsi died in 529/1135 in Nishapur.

See also 
 List of Ash'aris and Maturidis

References 

Shafi'is
Mujaddid
Hadith scholars
Sunni Muslim scholars of Islam
1059 births
1135 deaths
12th-century Muslim scholars of Islam
11th-century jurists
12th-century jurists
Biographical evaluation scholars